Serbo-Romanian may refer to:

 Romanians in Serbia
 Serbs of Romania
 Romanian language in Serbia

See also 
 Romania–Serbia relations